Thomas Gable Smith (18 October 1900 – 21 February 1934) was an English footballer who played as an inside right or outside right in the Football League for South Shields, Leicester City, Manchester United, Northampton Town and Norwich City.

Smith, known as Tosher, played for Marsden Villa and Whitburn before moving to South Shields in 1919. He went on to spend four seasons at Manchester United and three at Northampton Town.

Four of his six brothers were also footballers. Billy and Jack both played for South Shields and played in 1934 FA Cup Final together for Portsmouth. Sep later played for Leicester City, and Joe played reserve football for Leicester and later played for Watford.

References

External links
MUFCInfo.com profile

1900 births
1934 deaths
People from Whitburn, Tyne and Wear
Footballers from Tyne and Wear
Footballers from County Durham
English footballers
Association football inside forwards
Association football outside forwards
Whitburn F.C. players
South Shields F.C. (1889) players
Leicester City F.C. players
Manchester United F.C. players
Northampton Town F.C. players
Norwich City F.C. players
Tom